Stupava may refer to:

Stupava, Slovakia, a town in Slovakia
Stupava, Czech Republic, a village in the Czech Republic